Black on Black! is the third album by jazz organist Sonny Phillips, which was recorded in 1970 and released on the Prestige label.

Reception

Stewart Mason of Allmusic stated, "Sonny Phillips' third and final album for Prestige, coming just over a year after his first, shows the soul-jazz organist moving in a somewhat funkier direction than his first two efforts. The roiling title track actually has an edge of menace to it, an idea his other albums never even entertained".

Track listing 
All compositions by Sonny Phillips except where noted.
 "Black on Black" (Rusty Bryant, Sonny Phillips, Melvin Sparks, Jimmy Lewis, Bernard Purdie) – 5:30   
 "Check It Out" (Sonny Phillips) – 6:16   
 "Blues in Maude's Flat" (Grant Green) – 6:25   
 "Proud Mary" (John Fogerty) – 7:55   
 "The Doll House" (Jimmy Lewis) – 7:32

Personnel 
Sonny Phillips – organ
Rusty Bryant – alto saxophone, tenor saxophone
Melvin Sparks – guitar
Jimmy Lewis – electric bass
Bernard Purdie – drums

References 

Sonny Phillips albums
1970 albums
Prestige Records albums
Albums recorded at Van Gelder Studio
Albums produced by Bob Porter (record producer)